The 2013 Women's Hockey Junior World Cup was the seventh edition of the Women's Hockey Junior World Cup, held from 27 July to 4 August 2013 in Mönchengladbach, Germany.

Defending champions the Netherlands won the tournament for a record third time after defeating Argentina 4–2 in the final on a penalty shootout after a 1–1 draw. India won the third place match by defeating England 3–2 on a penalty shootout after a 1–1 draw to claim their first ever Junior World Cup medal.

Qualification
Each continental federation received a number of quotas depending on the FIH World Rankings for teams qualified through their junior continental championships. Alongside the host nation, 16 teams competed in the tournament.

 – France withdrew from participating. As the first reserve team was previously assigned to the European Federation, Russia took their place as winners of the 2012 EuroHockey Junior Nations Championship II.
 – Australia and New Zealand qualified automatically due to the lack of other competing teams in the Oceania qualifier.

Squads

First round
All times are Central European Summer Time (UTC+02:00)

Pool A

Pool B

Pool C

Pool D

Classification round

Bracket

Placement finals

Thirteenth to sixteenth place classification

Cross-overs

Fifteenth and sixteenth place

Thirteenth and fourteenth place

Ninth to twelfth place classification

Cross-overs

Eleventh and twelfth place

Ninth and tenth place

Medal round

Bracket

Quarter-finals

Fifth to eighth place classification

Cross-overs

Seventh and eighth place

Fifth and sixth place

First to fourth place classification

Semi-finals

Third and fourth place

Final

Awards

Statistics

Final ranking

Goalscorers

References

External links
Official FIH website
Official website 

 
Women's Hockey Junior World Cup
Junior World Cup
International women's field hockey competitions hosted by Germany
Hockey Junior World Cup
Hockey World Cup
Hockey Junior World Cup
Hockey Junior World Cup
Sport in Mönchengladbach
2010s in North Rhine-Westphalia
21st century in Mönchengladbach